Tandra Paparayudu is a 1986 Indian Telugu-language biographical war film directed by Dasari Narayana Rao and produced by U. Suryanarayana Raju. The film stars Krishnam Raju, Jaya Prada, Jayasudha, Sumalatha, Pran and Mohan Babu. It is based on the life of 18th century warrior Tandra Paparayudu, the General of Bobbili, and  General Bussy. The film was featured at the 11th International Film Festival of India. The film won two Nandi Awards.

Plot

Cast 
Krishnam Raju as Tandra Paparayudu
Jaya Prada as Jyothirmayi
Jayasudha as Mallamma
Sumalatha as Chinnamma
Pran as General Bussy
Mohan Babu as Vijaya Ramaraju
Rama Krishna as Ranga Rayudu
Hema Choudhary as Special Dancer
Kanta Rao
Dhulipala
M. Balaiah
J. V. Somayajulu
Kota Srinivasa Rao
Sudhakar
Prabha
Anjali Devi
Gummadi
Suryakantham
Nirmalamma
Vijayalalitha
Haranath

Soundtrack 

Singers S. P. Balasubrahmanyan, Vani Jayaram, Ramakrishna, K. J. Yesudas, P. Susheela,Mano

Abhinandhana Mandara
Chali Chali Reyi
Lalitha Pulakantha
Rajante Neevele
Malle Kanna Thellana
Sarva Praja Rakshana
Ariverra Bayadha
Ye Velpul
Kalla Parani
Athipragalbha
Nee Vachalatha
Athi Balyamunundi
Garavakarava

Accolades 
 Filmfare Best Actor Award (Telugu) – Krishnam Raju
 Nandi Award for Best Dialogue Writer – Kondaveeti Venkata Kavi
 Nandi Award for Best Costume Designer – Kameswara Rao

References

External links 

1980s biographical films
1980s historical films
1980s Telugu-language films
1980s war films
1986 films
Biographical films about royalty
Films about royalty
Films directed by Dasari Narayana Rao
Films produced by Krishnam Raju
Films scored by S. Rajeswara Rao
Films set in ancient India
Films set in the 1750s
Films set in the 18th century
Films set in the Indian independence movement
Historical epic films
History of India on film
Indian biographical films
Indian epic films
Indian films based on actual events
Indian historical films
Indian swashbuckler films
Indian war films
War epic films